National Highway 27 (NH 27), an East - West National highway in India that starts in Porbandar and ends in Silchar, the highway passes through the states of Gujarat, Rajasthan, Madhya Pradesh, Uttar Pradesh, Bihar, West Bengal, Assam.
NH-27 was laid and is maintained by Ministry of Road Transport and Highways (MoRTH). It is the second longest National Highway (after NH 44) in India and is a part of NS-EW Corridor of NHAI.

Route
National highway 27 transits across seven states of India in east - west direction.

Gujarat
Porbandar, Kutiyana, Upleta, Dhoraji, Jetpur, Gondal, Rajkot, Bamanbore, Morvi, Samakhiali, Radhanpur, Deesa, Palanpur

Rajasthan
Abu Road, Pindwara, Udaipur, Mangalwar, Chittaurgarh, Kota, Baran

7 DISTRICT - SIROHI, UDAIPUR, CHITTAURRGARH, BHILWARA, BUNDI, KOTA BARAN.

Madhya Pradesh
Shivpuri, Karera

Uttar Pradesh
Jhansi, Orai Kanpur, Unnao, Lucknow, Barabanki, Ayodhya, Basti, Khalilabad, Gorakhpur, Kushinagar

Bihar
Gopalganj, East Champaran, 
Muzaffarpur, Darbhanga, Jhanjharpur, Supaul, Forbesganj, Araria, Purnia and Kishanganj.

West Bengal
Dalkhola, Islampur, Bagdogra, Siliguri, Jalpaiguri, Mainaguri, Dhupguri, Falakata, Sonapur, Alipurduar, Kamakhyaguri

Assam
Bongaigaon, Bijni, Howly, Patacharkuchi, Nalbari, Rangiya, Guwahati, Nagaon, Hojai, Lanka, Lumding, Haflong, Silchar

Junctions list

Gujarat

  Terminal near Porbandar
  near Dhoraji
  near Jetpur
  near Jetpur
  Interchange near Bamanbore
  Interchange near Samakhiali
  near Radhanpur
  near Deesa
Rajasthan

  near Swaroopganj
  Interchange near Pindwara
  near Udaipur
  near Udaipur
  near Bhatevar (162EXT)
  interchange near Chittorgarh
  interchange near Chittorgarh
  near Ladpura 
  near Kota
  interchange near Baran

Madhya Pradesh
  near Shivpuri

Uttar Pradesh

  near Jhansi
  near Chirgaon
  near Bhognipur
  interchange near Barah village
  near Kanpur
  near Unnao
  at Lucknow
  near Barabanki
  near Ayodhya
  near Ayodhya
  near Ayodhya
  near Ayodhya
  near Ayodhya
  near Ayodhya
  near Basti
  near Gorakhpur
  near Gorakhpur
  near Kushinagar

Bihar

  near Gopalganj
  near Barauli
  near Mohammadpur
  near Pipra Kothi
  near Mehsi
  near Muzaffarpur
  near Muzaffarpur
  near Mehsi
  near Darbhanga
  near Jhanjharpur
  near Narahia
  near Bhaptiahi
  near Simrahi
  near Forbesganj
  near Araria 
  near Purnia
  near Purnia

West Bengal
  near Dalkhola
  near Ghoshpukur
  near Bagdogra
  near Siliguri
  near Mainaguri
  near Dhupguri
  near Falakata
  near Salsabari

Assam

  near Srirampur
  near Garubhasa
  near Shyamthai
  near Bijni
  near Howly
  near Pathsala
  near Barama
  near Rangia
  near Baihata
  near Jalukbari
  near Guwahati
  near Jorabat
  near Nakhola
  near Nelle
  near Nagaon
  near Dabaka
  near Lumding
  near Jatinga, Haflong
  Terminal near Silchar

Toll Plazas
List of toll plazas(statewise)
While going from Silchar to Porbandar (East to West)
Assam
Mikirati Hawgaon
Raha
Nazirakhat
Madanpur
Dahalapara
Patgaon
Srirampur
West Bengal
Paschim Madati
Surjapur
 Kamakhyaguri ( Guabari)
Bihar
Barsoni (Purnia)
Araria
Kosi Mahasetu
Raje
Maithi
Uttar Pradesh
Madhya Pradesh
Rajasthan
Udwariya
Malera 
Gujarat

Interactive Map

See also 

 List of National Highways in India
 List of National Highways in India by state

References

External links
 NH 27 on OpenStreetMap

AH1
National highways in India
National Highways in Gujarat
National Highways in Rajasthan
National Highways in Madhya Pradesh
National Highways in Uttar Pradesh
National Highways in Bihar
National Highways in West Bengal
National Highways in Assam
Transport in Porbandar
Transport in Silchar